Joni Savimäki (born 28 January 1991) is a Finnish former volleyball player. He was part of the Finland men's national volleyball team. On club level he played for Liiga-Riento.

References

External links
 profile at FIVB.org

1991 births
Living people
Finnish men's volleyball players
Place of birth missing (living people)
Volleyball players at the 2015 European Games
European Games competitors for Finland